Life Begins is a British television drama first broadcast on ITV between 16 February 2004 and 9 October 2006, starring Caroline Quentin and Alexander Armstrong, Anne Reid and Frank Finlay.

Premise

The story focuses on Philip Raymond (Phil) Mee and Margaret Eileen Brenda (Maggie) Thornhill-Mee and how their lives, plus those of their two children, James and Rebecca, change when Phil announces he is leaving Maggie for another woman. The first series follows Maggie's struggle to cope with adapting to single life, including finding a job, and later a new boyfriend, with the tables later turned on Phil somewhat when his new relationship fails. The series also features various friends and relatives of the couple and their dramas, such as the struggles of Maggie's parents, Eric and Brenda.

History

The first series of Life Begins began on 16 February 2004. The first series was a success. The show managed viewing figures ranging from 9.51 to 10.45 million winning all of its time-slots. The series has been aired on Channel Seven in Australia and TV ONE in New Zealand.

As the first Life Begins was so popular a second series was launched which began on 16 February 2005. Series two received strong ratings of 6.38 to 8.62 million. 
 
A third series started on 4 September 2006 on ITV. Again the viewing figures were still high managing to win half of its timeslots with figures of 5.79 to 6.32 million.

It was always intended by the writers that the third series would be the last. A fourth series, thought possible at the time, never materialized.

Cast
Caroline Quentin as Maggie Mee
Alexander Armstrong as Phil Mee
Elliot Henderson-Boyle as James Mee
Ace Ryan as Rebecca Mee
Anne Reid as Brenda Thornhill
Frank Finlay as Eric Thornhill
Claire Skinner as Clare
Stuart McQuarrie as Guy
Ellie Haddington as Kathleen
Sarah Ozeke as Karen
Beans El-Balawi as Freddie
Roy Dotrice as Frank
Alan Williams as George
Naomi Allis Stone as Anna
Nicholas Boulton as Kieron
Chloe Howman as Helen
Paul Thornley as Jeff
Danny Webb as Paul
Abby Ford as Samantha
Michelle Holmes as Genevieve
Finlay Robertson as Kevin
David Westhead as Brian
Suzanne Burden as Penny
Laura Patch as Tina
Alexandra Gilbreath as Mia
Matthew Cottle as Nick
Jon Newman as Simon
Lewis Rose as Tom
Kelly Hunter as Mrs Lane

Music
The music plays over the "next time" clip and the credits is the specially produced "Life Begins Mix" of Faithless' song "No Roots", from their album of the same name released in June 2004, four months after Life Begins began, meaning the song was debuted on the show in this version. Faithless' Sister Bliss provided other music for the series.

Episodes

Series 1 (2004)

Series 2 (2005)

Series 3 (2006)

Broadcast

UK air dates

Series One - 16 February 2004 to 22 March 2004
Series Two - 16 February 2005 to 30 March 2005
Series Three - 4 September 2006 to 9 October 2006

From June 2014, the show was repeated on ITV Encore ITV's new drama channel for sky customers.

International air dates

Ratings in Australia: The first episode of the first series aired over Australia's non ratings period, and the opening episode rated 1.1 million mainland capital city viewers, which was the 12th most watched show for the week. Ratings continued around the one million viewers mark throughout series one. The first episode of series two moved to 9:30pm and rated 998,000 viewers, ranking first in its time slot. The second episode rated 853,000 viewers.

References

Further reading

External links

2000s British drama television series
2004 British television series debuts
2006 British television series endings
ITV television dramas
Television series by ITV Studios
Television shows produced by Granada Television
English-language television shows
Television shows set in the United Kingdom